The 1802 Rhode Island gubernatorial election was an election held on April 21, 1802, to elect the Governor of Rhode Island. Arthur Fenner, the incumbent Governor and Democratic-Republican candidate, beat the Federalist candidate William Greene with 66.28% of the vote.

General election

Candidates
Arthur Fenner, incumbent Governor since 1790
William Greene, former Governor

Results

County results

References

Rhode Island gubernatorial elections
1802 Rhode Island elections
Rhode Island
April 1802 events